Kevin Sainte-Luce (born 28 April 1993) is a professional footballer who plays as a winger. Born in France, he represents the Guadeloupe national team at international level.

Career

Early years
Born in Paris, France, Sainte-Luce moved to Wales as a teenager and worked his way through the Cardiff City Academy under the stewardship of the Head of Academy Neal Ardley. The winger made his debut for the senior team on 14 August 2012, in a 2–1 defeat to Northampton Town in the First Round of the Football League Cup. However, despite showing promise for "The Bluebirds" the 19-year–old had his contract terminated on 29 January 2013 following an incident in which he was found guilty of assaulting two girls in a Cardiff nightclub. Sainte-Luce avoided a six–month prison sentence but was ordered to pay £1,250 compensation to the girls, given a 180-hour community service order and handed a 10–week 8pm–6am curfew for the unprovoked attack.

AFC Wimbledon
In spite of his run–in with the law, AFC Wimbledon manager Neal Ardley decided to offer the young winger a chance to prove himself, signing him on a six–month contract with the option of a further year on 31 January 2013. Sainte-Luce made his Football League debut in a 2–1 win over Bradford City on 16 February 2013 as a 64th minute substitute for Rashid Yussuff. Ardley's faith in him was soon repaid as on 23 February 2013, Sainte-Luce scored his first Football League goal for "The Dons" in a 1–0 win over Dagenham & Redbridge. The 19-year–old winger scored his second goal for the club in a 2–0 win over Morecambe on 23 March 2013. On 25 June 2013, it was announced that manager Neal Ardley had taken up the option of a one-year extension on the 20-year–old winger's contract, retaining him at Kingsmeadow|The Cherry Red Records Stadium for the 2013–14 season. On 7 January 2015, his contract was terminated by mutual consent due to a lack of first team action.

Gateshead
Sainte-Luce signed a short-term, six-month deal with Conference Premier side Gateshead on 15 January. Sainte-Luce made his Gateshead debut two days later in their 2–0 win at Nuneaton Town. He scored his first goals for Gateshead in their 2–2 draw at Grimsby Town on 4 April. However, he was not offered a new deal at the end of the season and left the club in June.

FC Dieppe
It was announced on 11 August 2015 that Sainte-Luce had signed for FC Dieppe.

Creteil
Saint-Luce joined Creteil for the 2016–17 season.

Rouen
On 14 June 2019, Sainte-Luce joined FC Rouen.

Career statistics

References

External links

1993 births
Living people
French people of Guadeloupean descent
Guadeloupean footballers
French footballers
Footballers from Paris
Guadeloupe international footballers
Association football wingers
Guadeloupe youth international footballers
Championnat National players
Championnat National 2 players
Championnat National 3 players
English Football League players
National League (English football) players
Cardiff City F.C. players
AFC Wimbledon players
Gateshead F.C. players
FC Dieppe players
US Créteil-Lusitanos players
FC Fleury 91 players
FC Rouen players
French expatriate footballers
Guadeloupean expatriate footballers
French expatriate sportspeople in England
Guadeloupean expatriate sportspeople in England
Expatriate footballers in England